Lonely Trip is the eleventh solo studio album from Trey Anastasio. Lonely Trip was released on July 31, 2020. The album was mixed by Bryce Goggin, and was recorded during the COVID-19 pandemic.

Recording process
The album was written during the COVID-19 pandemic, from March–July, 2020. Anastasio stated that the recording process of the album "felt therapeutic to write" and that he "wanted to connect with our community in some way. The unplanned nature of the recording meant I didn't have a lot of gear during this process. I had an electric and an acoustic guitar, a small amp, two microphones, some percussion, and two keyboards, including an old Kurzweil with very realistic drum sounds on it. Everything was recorded through a Spire 8-track. Lonely Trip is truly a raw, low-fi recording." Anastasio stated that Lonely Trip was "my message in a bottle during this time, and I wish I knew how to properly thank all of you in our community for listening and responding. It meant so much to me. Thank you. Wishing all of you much love and safety during this turbulent time."
Anastasio also dedicated the album to the heroism of our healthcare and essential workers.
Phish member Jon Fishman plays drums on the album; as stated by Anastasio "For the previous few Phish albums (including Kasvot Vaxt and Sigma Oasis), I had been experimenting with writing songs, starting with drum beats that I had sung into my phone. Fish and I would go into the studio and record the beats exactly as I had sung them, with Fish launching off in his unique way after a minute or two. I used these beats as building blocks to many of the songs on Lonely Trip, and it explains how I could do a whole album in Rubber Jungle with such good sounding drums."

Track listing

Personnel
 Trey Anastasio – guitar, keyboards, bass
 Jon Fishman – drums
 Bryce Goggin – mixing

References

2020 albums
Trey Anastasio albums